Malaysia competed in the 2006 Commonwealth Games held in Melbourne, Australia from 15 to 26 March 2006.

Medal summary

Medals by sport

Multiple medalists
Malaysian competitors that have won at least two medals.

Medallists
The following Malaysian competitors won medals at the games; all dates are for March 2006.

Athletics

Men
Track and road events

Field event

Women
Track events

Field events

Badminton

Individual

Doubles

Team

Basketball

Women's tournament
Roster

Goh Beng Fong
Teo Woon Yuen
Choo Seck Yun
Low Bee Chuan
Yoong Sze Yuin
Low Meei Fun
Chow Siao Foong
Kew Suik May
Beh Siew Lian
Thoh Chai Ling
Pee Yann Yann
Chew Yong Yong 

Group B

Fifth to eighth place classification

Seventh and eighth place match

Ranked 7th in final standings

Boxing

Men

Cycling

Road

Track
Sprint

Pursuit

Time trial

Points race

Scratch race

Keirin

Diving

Men

Women

Gymnastics

Artistic

Men

Women

Rhythmic

Hockey

Men's tournament

Roster

Mohd Nasihin Ibrahim (GK)
Muhamad Amin Rahim
Chua Boon Huat
Logan Raj Kali
Kuhan Shanmuganathan 
Nor Azlan Bakar
Megat Azrafiq
Jiwa Mohan
Mohd Madzli Mohd Nor
Tengku Ahmad Tajuddin
Mohd Rodzhanizam Mat Radzi
Keevan Raj Kali
Ismail Abu
Azlan Misron
Jivan Mohan
Kumar Subramaniam (GK)

Pool B

Semifinal

Bronze medal match

Ranked 3rd in final standings

Women's tournament

Roster

Fauziah Mizan (GK)
Intan Ahmad 
Sebah Kari
Noor Hasliza Md Ali
Siti Noor Amarina Ruhani
Juliani Mohamad Din
Norfaraha Hashim
Siti Rahmah Othman
Chitra Devi Arumugam
Kannagi Arumugam
Nadia Abdul Rahman
Norbaini Hashim
Ernawati Mahmud (GK)
Catherine Lambor
Siti Sarah Ismail
Nurul Shahizan Rahmat

Pool A

Fifth and sixth place match

Ranked 6th in final standings

Lawn bowls

Men

Women

Shooting

Men
Pistol/Small bore

Shotgun

Full bore

Women
Pistol/Small bore

Squash

Individual

Doubles

Swimming

Men

Women

Synchronized swimming

Table tennis

Singles

Doubles

Team

Triathlon

Women

Weightlifting

Men

Women

Powerlifting

References

Malaysia at the Commonwealth Games
Nations at the 2006 Commonwealth Games
2006 in Malaysian sport